Pablo Andrés Alvarado (born 27 February 1986 in El Calafate, Santa Cruz) is an Argentine footballer who plays as a defender for Palestino.

Career
Alvarado came through the youth system at C.A.I in Comodoro Rivadavia before being signed by San Lorenzo in 2004.

Alvarado has become a regular first team player for San Lorenzo, he has shown great versatility, being used in the defence, on the right wing and in central midfield. In 2007, he helped the club to win the Clausura tournament.

Honours
San Lorenzo
Argentine Primera División: 2007 Clausura, 2013 Inicial

International career
Alvarado represented the Argentina national under-17 football team, but has yet to receive a call up to a more senior level.

References

 Diego Osella lo pidió y Pablo Alvarado es la octava incorporación de Olimpo‚ lanueva.com, 23 January 2016

External links
 Argentine Primera statistics  
 Statistics at Football-Lineups
 

1986 births
Living people
People from El Calafate
Argentine footballers
Argentine expatriate footballers
Association football defenders
Argentina youth international footballers
San Lorenzo de Almagro footballers
Unión La Calera footballers
Club Atlético Belgrano footballers
Racing Club de Avellaneda footballers
Olimpo footballers
Godoy Cruz Antonio Tomba footballers
Defensa y Justicia footballers
C.S.D. Independiente del Valle footballers
Club Deportivo Palestino footballers
Chilean Primera División players
Argentine Primera División players
Primera Nacional players
Ecuadorian Serie A players
Argentine expatriate sportspeople in Chile
Argentine expatriate sportspeople in Ecuador
Expatriate footballers in Chile
Expatriate footballers in Ecuador